A forb or phorb is a herbaceous flowering plant that is not a graminoid (grass, sedge, or rush). The term is used in biology and in vegetation ecology, especially in relation to grasslands and understory. Typically these are dicots without woody stems.

Etymology
The word "forb" is derived from Greek phorbḗ, meaning "pasture" or "fodder".  The Hellenic spelling "phorb" is sometimes used, and in older usage this sometimes includes graminids and other plants currently not regarded as forbs.

Guilds
Forbs are members of a guilda group of plant species with broadly similar growth form. In certain contexts in ecology, guild membership may often be more important than the taxonomic relationships between organisms.

In informal classification
In addition to its use in ecology, the term "forb" may be used for subdividing popular guides to wildflowers, distinguishing them from other categories such as grasses, sedges, shrubs, and trees. Some examples of forbs are clovers, sunflowers, daylilies, and milkweed.

Examples
Linnaean taxonomy family names are given.
Acanthaceae,
Aizoaceae,
Amaranthaceae,
Apiaceae,
Apocynaceae,
Asclepiadaceae,
Asteraceae,
Balsaminaceae,
Begoniaceae,
Boraginaceae,
Brassicaceae,
Buxaceae,
Campanulaceae,
Cannabaceae,
Caryophyllaceae,
Chenopodiaceae,
Clusiaceae,
Convolvulaceae,
Crassulaceae,
Cucurbitaceae,
Cuscutaceae,
Dipsacaceae,
Ericaceae,
Euphorbiaceae,
Fabaceae,
Gentianaceae,
Geraniaceae,
Gunneraceae,
Haloragaceae,
Hydrophyllaceae,
Lamiaceae,
Lentibulariaceae,
Limnanthaceae,
Linaceae,
Lythraceae,
Malvaceae,
Moraceae,
Nyctaginaceae,
Onagraceae,
Orobanchaceae,
Oxalidaceae,
Papaveraceae,
Phytolaccaceae,
Plantaginaceae,
Plumbaginaceae,
Polemoniaceae,
Polygonaceae,
Portulacaceae,
Primulaceae,
Ranunculaceae,
Resedaceae,
Rosaceae,
Rubiaceae,
Scrophulariaceae,
Solanaceae,
Thymelaeaceae,
Urticaceae,
Valerianaceae,
Verbenaceae,
Violaceae,
Zygophyllaceae

See also

References

External links
 United States Department of Agriculture Natural Resources Conservation Service link to Growth habits Codes and Definitions.

Plant morphology
Plants by habit
Plant life-forms